The Karabin samopowtarzalny wzór 38M (Kbsp wz.38M self-repeating rifle Model 38M), was a prototype Polish 7.92mm semi-automatic rifle used by the Polish Army during the Invasion of Poland of 1939.

History
The rifle was designed by a Polish engineer Józef Maroszek (1904-1985). He was known mainly as a designer of the Polish anti-tank rifle wz.1935 "Ur". Maroszek was one of the three winners of Poland’s 1934 self-loading rifle trials. Several prototypes and pre-production samples of his rifle were manufactured from 1936 to 1938. After a Polish army order was received, small scale production began in 1938. It is believed only about 150 rifles of this pattern were completed before the German invasion of Poland. Production was not resumed under the German occupation. The wz.38M rifles were manufactured by the Zbrojownia Nr. 2 (Arsenal No.2) in Warsaw (Praga). Barrels were supplied by the Panstwowa Fabryka Karabinow (State Rifle Factory) in Warsaw.

The highest serial number observed is 1054 (it is assumed numbering started from "1001", not counting the prototypes and pre-production examples). The decision was made to begin serial production of the rifle at the Fabryka Broni (the Arms Factory) in Radom in 1938. However, it is unclear if any rifles of this pattern left the Radom factory before the German invasion (all the surviving examples display Arsenal Nr. 2's "Zbr.2" markings). Maroszek stated he had seen a group of German soldiers armed with wz.38M rifles in occupied Warsaw. This is perhaps the only indication Maroszek rifles were reissued to Nazi forces.

The rifle is gas operated with the gas tube located under the barrel. It features a Browning/Petter system in which the bolt tilts up to lock; in the case of the Kbsp wz.1938M, against the front edge of the ejection/loading aperture in the top of the receiver. It has a ten-round non-detachable magazine loaded from Mauser stripper clips. The safety lever is located on the right side of the receiver, just above the trigger. The bayonet lug accepts a standard Polish issue wz.29, and the barrel is equipped with a muzzle brake to ameliorate recoil. For a pioneering self-loading rifle, its design is strikingly advanced in its simplicity and functionality; for example, it's composed of several sub-sections interlocked by a single removable steel pin, and thus can be disassembled in moments. Today, this is a difficult to find military rifle on the collector market. There are only nine known examples in collections around the world (1. Polish Army Museum, Warsaw, Poland, deactivated; 2. Central Armed Forces Museum, Moscow, Russia; 3, 4, 5, 6, 7, 8. private collections in the USA; 9. private collection in Germany). The known serial numbers are: 1014, 1017, 1019, 1027, 1030, 1040, 1048, 1054. (The Russian museum and the Ohio collection rifles serial numbers are unknown.)

In April 2017, serial number 1048 was acquired at auction by the Polish government for $69,000.

Military usage
There is only one known example of military usage of this rifle in action which, almost uniquely, was by Maroszek himself. While personnel were evacuating from Instytut Techniki Uzbrojenia (Weaponry Technology Institute) the train they were traveling in was attacked near the city of Zdołbunow by two German warplanes flying at low altitude.  As he states in his memoirs, Maroszek kept shooting through the window, eventually killing the gunner and wounding the pilot of one of the planes, forcing it to land. This event was also confirmed by other passengers.

See also
ZH-29

References
 
 Z. Gwozdz & P. Zarzycki, "Polskie Konstrukcje Broni Strzeleckiej", 1993.

External links

 Polish wz. 38M Maroszek at collectiblefirearms.com
 Kbsp wz. 1938M at dobroni.pl 

7.92×57mm Mauser semi-automatic rifles
World War II semi-automatic rifles
World War II infantry weapons of Poland
Rifles of Poland
Military equipment introduced in the 1930s